Morgan Yaeger (born 18 April 1998) is an Australian professional basketball player.

College
Yaeger played college basketball at the University of Oregon in Eugene, Oregon for the Ducks in NCAA Division I. Yaeger began her career in 2016 as part of a highly touted recruiting class that included future two-time national college player of the year and #1 WNBA draft pick Sabrina Ionescu and another future first-round draft pick in Ruthy Hebard. After missing the 2017–18 season due to a back injury, she was scheduled to complete her college career in 2021. However in June 2020, Yaeger announced her medical retirement and that she would forgo her fifth year of eligibility in 2020–21.

Oregon statistics
Source

Career

WNBL
Yaeger began her WNBL career at a young age, as a development player with the Adelaide Lightning. She would since depart to pursue her college basketball career in the United States. In 2020, it was announced Yaeger would return to the Adelaide Lightning for her second season in the WNBL. In 2022 she played for the Sydney Uni Flames before moving to Townsville fire at the beginning of the 2022/23 season. Amongst that she has played for the southern tigers in the NBL1 Central league; Winning the championship in 2021.

National Team

Youth Level
Yaeger first represented Australia in 2013, at the FIBA Oceania Under-16 Championship in Melbourne. She would then go on to represent Australia, at the 2014 FIBA Under-17 World Championship in the Czech Republic.

References

1998 births
Living people
Guards (basketball)
Australian expatriate basketball people in the United States
Australian women's basketball players
Oregon Ducks women's basketball players